Casey Cutler (born c. 1980) was arrested on 6 June 2005, in Arizona, after sparking a full terrorism investigation and raid over his attempts to extract ricin from castor oil. Ricin cannot be made from castor oil.  The recipe requires castor beans. It can be made using a recipe Cutler had downloaded from the Internet.

In court, he pleaded that he was trying to manufacture the poison to protect himself from being beaten by the drug dealers to whom he owed money.  He was convicted, with his sentence adjusted downward from that recommended by the Sentencing Guidelines. Upon release, his sentence called for Cutler to be placed in a mental health institution.

His case is listed in the "WMD" section of the Senate Making America Safer report.

See also 
 List of terrorist incidents in the United States
 Wood Green ricin plot

References

American male criminals
Living people
Place of birth missing (living people)
1980s births